Mediagua, is the name given in Chile to a type of prefabricated house, constructed of wood panels, which can be erected in less than a day.

They are traditionally used to provide emergency housing solutions after natural disasters, or to give an inexpensive house to homeless people.

Because they are designed as temporary solutions they are commonly installed without sanitation or electricity, but often they become permanent homes.

Elements

There is also a model of half the area of the former, for single people and couples.

The house is divided in two rooms.

History

In the mid-nineteenth century the first slums began to appear around Santiago de Chile, where unskilled workers lived. The sanitation, safety and housing were deplorable. The houses were built with waste materials. The conditions had not changed by 1960. At that time groups associated with the Jesuits began to build mediaguas for poor people. In 1962 the Hogar de Cristo (Home of Christ) Foundation (founded by St. Alberto Hurtado) built 1000 mediaguas, and by 2010 they had built over 400,000 mediaguas in total.

Mediaguas were built by the government to house the victims of the earthquakes in Valdivia (1960), La Ligua (1965), Santiago (1985) and Tocopilla (2007).

After the 2010 Chile earthquake the housing foundation Un Techo para Chile ("A Roof for Chile") started a national  campaign that raised the money to build more than 40,000 mediaguas for the victims.

References

External links 

  Un Techo para Chile
  Video tutorial on how to build a mediagua part 1 - part 2 - part 3 - part 4 - part 5 - part 6 - part 7 - part 8
  Hogar de Cristo

Architecture in Chile